17β-Hydroxysteroid dehydrogenase type 13 also known as 17β-HSD type 13 is an enzyme that in humans is encoded by the HSD17B13 gene.

17β-HSD13 is significantly up-regulated in the liver of patients with non-alcoholic fatty liver disease (NAFLD) and enhances lipogenesis.

References

Enzymes